Live at the Fillmore East is an album by the rock band Jefferson Airplane.  It was recorded on May 3 and 4, 1968, at the Fillmore East in New York City.  It was released on April 28, 1998. It is not to be confused with the similarly named Jefferson Airplane album Sweeping Up the Spotlight: Live at the Fillmore East 1969.

The song "Thing" is an experimental freeform instrumental that later morphed into "Bear Melt", which appears on Bless Its Pointed Little Head.

Track listing

Personnel
Jefferson Airplane
Marty Balin - vocals, guitar, bass on "Fat Angel"
Grace Slick - vocals, piano
Jorma Kaukonen - lead guitar, vocals
Paul Kantner - rhythm guitar, vocals
Jack Casady - bass, rhythm guitar on "Fat Angel"
Spencer Dryden - drums, percussion
Production
Produced by Paul Williams
Compiled by Bill Thompson, Paul Williams
Recording: John Chester
Mixing: Mike Hartry
Audio restoration: Bill Lacey
Essay: Jeff Tamarkin

References

Live at the Fillmore East albums
Jefferson Airplane live albums
1998 live albums
RCA Records live albums